is the third studio album by Japanese band Garnet Crow. It was released on November 12, 2003 under Giza Studio.

Background
The album consists of the four previously released singles.

The single Yume Mita Ato de received new mixed version under title lightin' grooves True meaning of love mix. The track was arranged by Daisuke Ikeda.

Spiral was released in Giza Studio's compilation album Giza Studio Masterpiece Blend 2002. Eien wo Kakenukeru Isshun no Bokura and Nakenai Yoru mo Nakanai Asa mo in the compilation album Giza Studio Masterpiece Blend 2003.

In 2010, Koisuru Koto Shika Dekinai Mitai ni received in their conceptual album All Lovers with completely new recording and mix under the title .

Commercial performance 
"Crystallize: Kimi to Iu Hikari" made its chart debut on the official Oricon Albums Chart at #5 rank for first week with 45,163 sold copies. It charted for 13 weeks and sold 84,071 copies.

Track listing 
All tracks are composed by Yuri Nakamura, written by Nana Azuki and arranged by Hirohito Furui.

Personnel
Credits adapted from the CD booklet of Crystallize: Kimi to Iu Hikari.

Yuri Nakamura - vocals, composing
Nana Azuki - songwriting, keyboard
Hirohito Furui - arranging, keyboard
Hitoshi Okamoto - acoustic guitar, bass
Yoshinobu Ohga (ex. nothin' but love) -guitar
Fernando Huergo - bass
Jeff Lockheart - electronic guitar
Miguel Sa' Pessoa - piano, sound producing, arranging
Daisuke Ikeda - arranging
Yoshinori Akai - recording engineer
Katsuyuki Yoshimatsu - recording engineer

Tatsuya Okada - recording engineer
Aki Morimoto - recording engineer
Katsuo Urano - recording engineer
Makoto Fudoh - recording engineer
Akio Nakajima - mixing engineer
Takayuki Ichikawa - mixing engineer
Tomoko Nozaki - mixing engineer
Shin Takakuwa - mixing engineer
Masahiro Shimada - mastering engineer
Be Planning - art direction
Kanonji - producing

Usage in media 
Spiral - theme song in Fuji TV program Sport!
Crystal Gauge - ending theme in TBS program Pooh!
Nakenai Yoru mo Nakanai Asa mo - ending theme for Fuji TV program Uchimura Produce
Kimi to Iu Hikari - ending theme for Anime television series Detective Conan
Eien wo Kakenukeru Isshun no Bokura - ending theme for Tokyo Broadcasting System Television program Sunday Japan

References 

2003 albums
Giza Studio albums
Being Inc. albums
Japanese-language albums
Garnet Crow albums
Albums produced by Daiko Nagato